The Veterrimi IV (veterrimi four or V4) is a rugby tournament between four of the oldest rugby playing schools in the world. The event is scheduled to be held biennially or triennially (every two to three years). "Veterrimi" is Latin for "oldest".

Conception
The idea for the Veterrimi IV tournament came from Durham School's director of sport, Ben Mason. To celebrate the long histories of playing rugby in English schools he conceived bringing four of the oldest of these clubs together to play a two-day tournament. On the first day participating in a round-robin tournament to qualify for a final and a third-fourth "wooden-spoon" match on the second day.

Participants
Schools that have taken part in the tournament are:

Trophy
The winner of the Veterrimi IV tournament is awarded the AJ Dingle Trophy named in honour of Arthur James Dingle who was a pupil at Durham School, an Oxford Blue and who was capped three times for England playing on the wing. He participated in the very last Five Nations match before the outbreak of war before joining the East Yorkshire Regiment and, after a failed attack during the largest battle of the Gallipoli campaign, he was listed as missing presumed killed. His body was never found.

Inaugural tournament (Durham 2010)

The first tournament was hosted by Durham School, taking place on Saturday 23 October. There was unrelenting rain but the supporters turned out in their hundreds to be part of this special day. Durham School and Rugby School battled it out in the final, with the A J Dingle Trophy finally going to Rugby School. The event received extensive coverage by the national and local press as well as specialist rugby media including Sky Sports Rugby Club News, Sky Sports News, BBC Look North and Metro Radio.

Round robin

|}

Knockout

Second tournament (Sherborne 2013)
Rugby School, having won the first tournament, dropped out of the second; St Paul's School took their place. Sherborne were missing two players, both of whom had been selected to play for England U18 against Leicester Academy. The first four games on the first day finished with two out of two wins for St Paul's and Durham. The remaining two games being unnecessary to decide the finalists it was decided that straight finals would be played on the Sunday with Durham and St Paul's in the main final and Sherborne and Cheltenham playing in the 3rd/4th place play-off. After day 1 of the competition Sherborne School hosted a black tie dinner for parents and players with guest speaker John Bentley. Durham were presented with the AJ Dingle cup by Tim Stirk (OD), president of England Rugby Football Schools Union.

Round robin

|}

Knockout

Third tournament (Cheltenham 2015)
The next occurrence of the event was held by Cheltenham between Friday 30 October and Sunday 1 November 2015.  The first round of matches started at 10am, the second round at 12noon with a hog roast between 12noon and 2pm.  The teams taking part were Cheltenham, Durham, Sherborne and St Paul's. St Paul's won this third edition of the series.

Round robin

|}

Knockout

Fourth tournament (2017)
There is, as yet, no host determined for the fourth tournament.

Round robin

|}

Knockout

See also
http://www.schoolssports.com/CompetitionMicrosite/?TID=0d8664a6-cee1-4cba-b72c-b554fb3b3603

References

High school rugby union